Hobbs Municipal Schools (HMS) is a school district based in Hobbs, New Mexico.

In addition to Hobbs it serves Monument, Nadine, and North Hobbs.

History
Circa 2015 the number of students increased to 10,000, but declined after a decline in the oil market. In October 2017 the number of students was at 10,070.

In early 2019, when the 2018-2019 school year ended, the student count was 10,341. This increased to 10,615 five days after the beginning of the subsequent school year, in fall 2019. In 2020, because schools in New Mexico ended in-person learning because of the COVID-19 pandemic and because Texas schools in general had better academic reputations than New Mexican schools, several New Mexico students moved to Texas. That same year, enrollment figures were down by 1,232.

By 2022 the school district's enrollment was on an upward trajectory.

Academic performance
During the COVID-19 pandemic in New Mexico, in 2020, about 70% of the students at the secondary level failed at least one class due to the pandemic-related difficulties of education.

Schools
 High schools
 Hobbs High School
 Hobbs Freshman High School

 Middle schools
 Heizer Middle School
 Highland Middle School
 The 700-person Highland Middle, formerly Highland Junior High School, opened in 1959. The building has no windows.
 Houston Middle School

 Elementary schools
 Broadmoor Elementary School
 College Lane Elementary School
 Coronado Elementary School
 Edison Elementary School
 Jefferson Elementary School
 Mills Elementary School
 Murray Elementary School
 Will Rogers Elementary School
 Sanger Elementary School
 Southern Heights Elementary School
 Stone Elementary School
 Taylor Elementary School
 Booker T. Washington Elementary School

 Alternative school
 Alternative Learning Center
 CTECH Vocational training center

References

External links
 Hobbs Municipal Schools
 Index of articles at Hobbs News-Sun

School districts in New Mexico
Education in Lea County, New Mexico